WJNI (106.3 FM) is a radio station broadcasting a Gospel format. Licensed to Ladson, South Carolina, United States, it serves the Charleston, South Carolina area. The station is currently owned by Kirkman Broadcasting Inc. The station's studios are located in the West Ashley portion of Charleston and its transmitter is in North Charleston. WCDC currently simulcasts WJNI.

History
In Spring 1999, WJNI jumped from 16th in the Winter ratings to 12th; a year earlier it was not even on the air. Cliff Fletcher said the station drew listeners from stations owned by big companies because it was unique, with community involvement and "empowerment" major features of the format. The target audience was 25 to 44.

In Winter 2002, WJNI reached number six.

As of August 17, 2020, the W221CI translator at 92.1 was temporarily simulcasting WJNI but planned to return to airing the HD-2 programming, which had been classic hits, heard on WQNT and W271CP 102.1.

References

External links

JNI
Radio stations established in 1998
Gospel radio stations in the United States